Andrew C. Barrett (born April 14, 1940) is an American attorney who served as a Commissioner of the Federal Communications Commission from 1989 to 1996.

References

1940 births
Living people
Members of the Federal Communications Commission
Illinois Republicans
George H. W. Bush administration personnel
Clinton administration personnel